"Blue Honey" is the first single from debut full-length album by English musician Pop Levi and was released on September 4, 2006. 
It is also included in the Amorphous Androgynous compilation, A Monstrous Psychedelic Bubble Exploding in Your Mind: Volume 1.


Track listings

Extended Play CD
"Blue Honey Listen"
"(A Style Called) Cryin' Chic"
"Mornin' Light"
"Baby Again" [Midnight Version]
"Skip Ghetto" [Echo Park Version]

7" Single
"Blue Honey"
"(A Style Called) Cryin' Chic"

10" Single
"Blue Honey"
"(A Style Called) Cryin' Chic"
"Baby Again (Midnight Version)"

Video

The original video for the 2005 single release on Invicta Hi-Fi Records was directed by Jackie Passmore and can be watched here:

Later, with subsequent 2006 re-release on Counter Records, another version of the video was directed by Christian Swegal of Factory Features, and can be watched here:

2006 singles
2006 songs